Thomas Joseph Whelan (March 4, 1911 – June 1, 1974) was an American football player who played one season with the Pittsburgh Pirates of the National Football League. He played college football at The Catholic University of America.

References

External links
Just Sports Stats

1911 births
1974 deaths
American football running backs
American football defensive backs
Catholic University Cardinals football players
Pittsburgh Pirates (football) players
Players of American football from New York City